Mocis sobria is a species of moth of the family Erebidae. It is found in Surinam and Brazil.

References

Moths described in 1880
Mocis
Moths of South America